kiki the nano bot is an open-source puzzle video game designed by Thorsten Kohnhorst and first released in 2005. It is a mixture of the games Sokoban and Kula World. It is available for Microsoft Windows, Linux, FreeBSD and Mac OS X.

Plot 
The game's protagonist is a nano bot called Kiki. Kiki is the only bot left sane from a "parasitic capacity" that affected the nano world where he lived, leaving all the nano bots produced in that world "lazy stupid little robots/which shoot each other/and destroy the nano world". Kiki's task is to "repair the maker" of the nano bots.

Gameplay 

In each level, certain task must be performed, so the exit gate can be activated, then, if kiki moves through the activated exit gate, it will be 'beamed' to the next level. Gravity works towards the surface you were last touching and kiki can walk around the walls and on all sides of any block. The game has 50 levels, which can be viewed by selecting "Statistics", in the main menu, in which the progress of the user appears.

Levels 

Number of levels : 50

 START
 STEPS
 MOVE
 ELECTRO
 ELEVATE 
 THROW
 GOLD
 JUMP
 ESCAPE
 GEARS
 GAMMA
 CUBE
 SWITCH
 BORG
 MINI
 BLOCKS
 BOMBS
 SANDBOX
 ENERGY
 MAZE
 LOVE
 TOWERS
 EDGE
 RANDOM
 PLATE
 NICE
 ENTROPY
 SLICK
 BRIDGE
 FLOWER
 STONES
 WALLS
 GRID
 RINGS
 CORE
 BRONZE
 POOL
 HIDDEN
 CHURCH
 STRANGE
 MESH
 COLUMNS
 MACHINE
 NEUTRON
 CAPTURED
 CIRCUIT
 REGAL
 CONDUCTOR
 EVIL
 MUTANTS

Reception 
It won the Categories 'Best Graphics', 'Best Originality' and 'Best Overall Game' in the uDevGame Game Programming Contest 2002.

The game was downloaded between 2003 and May 2017 alone from SourceForge.net over 170,000 times. A review at acid-play.com was favourably with 4.9 of 5 points. Freeware game website Planet Free Play called in 2005 kiki the nanobot "one of the best freeware games ever.". Inside Mac Games reviewed the game favourably, recommending to give it a try "If you're in the mood for a good, challenging, puzzle game.".

References

External links 
 at sourceforge.net

Cross-platform software
Puzzle video games
Windows games
Linux games
MacOS games
Open-source video games
Public-domain software with source code
Freeware games